Jean-François Mancel (born March 1, 1948 in Beauvais, Oise) is a French politician.  He was a member of the National Assembly of France, representing Oise's 2nd constituency from 2002 to 2017, as a member of the Union for a Popular Movement.

References

1948 births
Living people
People from Beauvais
Union for a Popular Movement politicians
Deputies of the 12th National Assembly of the French Fifth Republic
Deputies of the 13th National Assembly of the French Fifth Republic
Deputies of the 14th National Assembly of the French Fifth Republic